Jamacha is a neighborhood in the southeastern area of San Diego, California. It is generally bounded by the city of Lemon Grove to the north, unincorporated La Presa to the east, Imperial Avenue and Encanto to the west, and Skyline and Lomita Village to the south. Major thoroughfares include Lisbon Street, Jamacha Road, and Woodrow Avenue.  The neighborhood is part of the Skyline-Paradise Hills Community Planning Area.

History
Jamacha is named for the Jamacha Valley and Rancho Jamacha, a Mexican land grant estate. The name was variously spelled Xamacha, Jamacha', 'Jamacho, and Gamacha until Jamacha was fixed as the official spelling in the early 20th century. The word is likely derived from a Spanish adaptation of the Kumeyaay Indian word Xamca, meaning "wild gourd."

Background
Jamacha is a largely residential neighborhood, with mostly single-family houses mixing with some multi-family development. There is also some small-scale commercial development in the neighborhood.

Geography
The Skyline-Paradise Hills Community as a whole make up approximately 4,500 acres. Much like the surrounding neighborhoods of Bay Terraces, Skyline, and Paradise Hills, Jamacha is comprised predominantly of low-density single-family homes spread across the hilly area. A major geographic feature is Paradise Valley, which runs on an east-west axis through the middle of the community and gives rise to the Paradise Creek, which flows into San Diego Bay. Jamacha, along with Lomita, Skyline, and North Bay Terrace, are directly north of Paradise Valley.

Demographics
Demographic statistics are only available for Jamacha in conjunction with bordering Lomita. Jamacha-Lomita is very diverse. Combined, the demographics for Jamacha-Lomita are as follows: Hispanic-Latino are the largest group at 51.1%, followed by African-Americans at 17.7%, Asian at 13.6%, non-Hispanic Whites at 13.0%, Mixed race at 3.9% and others at 0.7%.

References

Neighborhoods in San Diego